Anthony Howard may refer to:

 Anthony Howard (American football) (born 1960), American football player
 Anthony Howard (journalist) (1934–2010), British journalist
 Anthony Howard (swimmer) (born 1979), British swimmer

See also
 Ralph Anthony Howard (active from 2005), US politician in Alabama
 Tony Howard (born 1946), West Indian cricketer